Super Smash Flash is a series of fighting browser games published by indie company McLeodGaming, led by Gregory McLeod under the alias Cleod9. It is based on the Super Smash Bros series. The original Super Smash Flash is based specifically on Super Smash Bros. Melee. Its follow-up, also considered a reboot, is Super Smash Flash 2.

Gameplay 

Like in the official Super Smash Bros. games, the player's objective is to knock opponents off of the screen. Players are given a percentage counter instead of a health bar, which increases as they take damage. Each character is a well known video game character that are somewhat famous. Players will also have special moves with each button. A higher damage percentage means that attacks will send the player farther, which may ultimately lead to a KO.

The games are not direct clones of the official games, as they feature adjusted mechanics and playable content, both stages and characters, not present in the original Super Smash Bros. series by virtue of being a fan made project.

In the original Super Smash Flash, characters only have a total of five attacks each, activated by pressing the "P" key along with an arrow key, and some characters had an extra attack while jumping. The reboot, Super Smash Flash 2, offers controls much more similar to those of the official games. Along with the option to use a keyboard like its predecessor, SSF2 adds support for external game controllers and other gaming devices that can be used for computers.

As with the official Super Smash Bros. games, both Super Smash Flash and Super Smash Flash 2 include several single-player modes, such as campaigns to defeat a series of computer-controlled opponents, events that have specific goals to clear, mini-games to test the player, etc. Players are awarded with numerous rewards and other collectibles by clearing single-player modes.

The original game features three single-player modes. In Regular Match, players can choose between Classic and Adventure Modes; once the whole roster has been unlocked, All-Star Mode becomes available. In Stadium, several mini-games and challenges are pitched to the player such as destroying eight targets using each character's own abilities in Target Test or defeating grey-shaded versions of the playable roster in Multi-Man Melee. In Training Mode, players can tune up their playing skills by setting several parameters of their own.

The reboot expands the single-player experience. Classic Mode, for instance, has a greater variety of opponents. All-Star Mode features a fixed order of opponents fought and more opponents per match. For Stadium, Target Test has been renamed Target Smash and features four selectable levels each with a set pattern for targets on each level, as well as a fifth specially designed level for each character that tests their own abilities to destroy the targets. Multi-Man Melee is now called Multi-Man Smash and the player now confronts black-palette versions of Mario, Link, Kirby, and Pikachu, all of whom have very limited movesets and high stamina. A missing Stadium sub-mode from the official games that is absent from the original SSF gets reincorporated: Home-Run Contest, where the objective is to launch the Sandbag as far as possible by first racking up its damage, players are able to enable and disable a protective barrier that prevents the sandbag of getting out of the main platform, unless launched strong enough to break it. A new original Stadium sub-mode to be incorporated is Crystal Smash, where the objective is to destroy a multitude of crystals as quickly as possible. An Event Mode is also implemented, where players have to complete specific missions or defeat certain characters to accomplish the event; there is a total of 51 events to complete in the game.

Multiplayer 
Both Super Smash Flash and Super Smash Flash 2 feature standard multiplayer battles, both against other players on the same machine and against computer-controlled characters with configurable difficulty levels.

The original game was very limited by its software Flash potential; aside from only one multiplayer mode (coined as Melee mode), matches were limited for only two human players per match; the other remaining two slots could be filled with CPU players only. The camera was only able to follow player one, leaving player two at a noticeable disadvantage.

SSF2 expanded the multiplayer mode by introducing four player-entries controlled by human players and a dynamic camera system. Version 0.9b introduced Special Smash, a mode similar to the official Super Smash Bros. games in which certain "game modifiers" like Mini (shrinks all characters), Slow (lowers the game speed), Turbo (which enables any attack to be cancelled on hit, directly taken with permission from fellow fan game Project M), or Super Smash Flash (which recreates the quirky and glitchy engine of the original game like attacks hitting once per frame, applying no hitlag, characters become unable to hold onto ledges, etc.) can be applied to matches. The Beta version introduced an original mode called Arena Mode, which enabled players to participate in some mini-games playing with the existing physics and characters in unorthodox-for-the-series ways using the Sandbag, much like Stadium on the single-player mode. There are currently two known sub-modes: The first is called Sandbag Soccer, in which players are pitched in an enclosed stage sorted to two teams, red and blue, and have to get the Sandbag into the opposing team's goal. The first team that reaches the number of goals set prior to the match wins. The other is called Sandbag Basketball and features a similar premise to the former, except players now have to get the Sandbag to pass through the opposing team's hoop to score.

Ever since demo version 0.9b of SSF2, players can fight against opponents online through a proprietary system dubbed the "McLeodGaming Network". Connections use the proprietary Adobe RTMFP technology unless the "high latency" setting is chosen, which hands the players off to a server rather than using a P2P connection.

Playable characters 
The original Super Smash Flash features 30 characters. These characters represent a wide variety of media, spanning not only video games but also manga, animated film, and fan-made creations. Like in the Super Smash Bros. series, a number of these characters must be "unlocked" through various means.

Super Smash Flash 2 Beta currently features 47 playable characters. As the game is still in development, this number is still subject to change. Fan-made newcomers from the previous game will not reappear due to the developers wanting to give a more professional tone to the game.

Development 
Development of the original Super Smash Flash began around mid-2006, as Cleod9's first Flash game project on his then TI-89-centric website, McLeodGaming, after understanding Flash coding well enough to make a full-fledged game. Although known for being a difficult game, its gameplay was hardly like that of the original Super Smash Bros. games. Originally, the game was a combat-oriented platform game starring Sonic the Hedgehog fan-characters called "Blade" and "Blue" (whom would remain playable characters even in the final product), and the focus was to get through a large level with suspended platforms taking out flying robotic bees called Buzzers (enemies from the Sega Genesis game, Sonic the Hedgehog 2). The game was eventually reworked into a Super Smash Bros. fan game—then early called a "flash Smash engine" by Cleod9—where small updates began incorporating new content, be new playable characters, stages or items It was based on Super Smash Bros. Melee as that was the current title in the official series at the time. As Cleod9's first big flash project, the game was considered "a great success for its time". The game was completed within roughly half a year's time without any outside coding assistance, and was released August 21, 2006 on Newgrounds, a website known for its user-made Flash content. It is currently the 15th most played game ever on Newgrounds.

Super Smash Flash 2 

The success of Super Smash Flash soon led to high demand for a sequel. When McLeodGaming first started development on Super Smash Flash 2 in 2007, the game was planned to be a sequel to the original Super Smash Flash, with the incremental aesthetic and gameplay improvements. This plan was ultimately discarded in favor of making a fresh, new start to reboot the series. Despite the title, Super Smash Flash 2 is not actually a sequel; it is an entirely new game, and only retains the original name of the project because of how widely known the title has become throughout the fanbase. Although the game is not complete yet, pre-releases – also known as demos of the game – have been posted to their website for users and fans to see how far in development the game is. Various attempts to post minor updates to the game have also been posted to the "Smash Flash DOJO", one of several websites run by developers based on a similar Nintendo-run site for the Smash Bros. series, but each attempt has been abandoned. Updates are also occasionally posted on the team's Facebook and Twitter pages.

There were two major turning points in the game's development. The first was on January 1, 2009, on the release of v0.4a. This was the point where the game began to sharply grow considerably more complex, leading to snags in development as the difficulty of adding new characters was stated by Cleod to have "increased exponentially" at this point. The second turning point came with the following release, v0.7, on January 1, 2011. Initially thought to merely be an update that added content, Black Mage was included as a hidden character after playing ten battles. This was a shock to the fanbase, as he was the first character to be introduced who was not in the originally planned character roster. Directly related to knowledge of his surprise inclusion spreading among the general fanbase, McLeodGaming soon made an announcement that the oft-criticized planned roster had undergone a complete overhaul.

The final demo, Super Smash Flash 2 Beta, was announced on January 25, 2015. It was notable for dropping both the version number and designating itself as a beta version rather than a demo. On May 29, 2017, Super Smash Flash 2 Beta was finally released after three years of development, it added various aspects to stand on its own as a game, both present in the official Super Smash Bros. titles, such as Classic Mode (primarily in the vein of the original Super Smash Bros., but with added elements), and original to the game, such as Arena Mode. Updates to this version are designated with a separate version number starting at 1.0, with the latest update being Beta 1.3.1, which was released on August 12, 2021.

Reception 
Super Smash Flash garnered a mixed to positive critical reception. Though initially reviewed positively, later reviews such as one on FlashGN found the game to be "lacking control", and "simply a buggy and flawed attempt at recreating one of the best fighting games of all time." Despite some poor reviews, Super Smash Flash earned a Newgrounds daily feature award, over 11 million views, and a four star rating, and later was categorized as making "Flash Portal History" for 2006. The game has picked up several other minor awards.

Super Smash Flash 2, though currently "a work in progress", has gained significantly more traction than its predecessor. It was featured in GamesRadar's "10 fan games that shouldn't be ceased or desisted" as #5 while still in its infancy, and gained a feature article on GoNintendo. Shortly before the release of version 0.9b, one writer for the video gaming website Polygon opined that "There's a low-fi pixel art aesthetic and a sense of freedom that makes Super Smash Flash 2 more appealing to me than the real thing." Super Smash Flash 2's demos maintain over 400,000 plays a day on McLeodGaming alone, and peaked at over 1 million daily plays on January 20, 2013.  Notably, the game's work-in-progress v0.9a demo was featured as an indie game at the worldwide Super Smash Bros. tournament Apex 2013, and returned the following two years with subsequent updates.

References

External links 
 Super Smash Flash website
 McLeodGaming website

2006 video games
Crossover video games
Action video games
Fighting games
Video games developed in the United States
Platform games
Platform fighters
Fangames
Flash games
Super Smash Bros.